Gayenna is a genus of anyphaenid sac spiders first described by H. Nicolet in 1849.

Species
 it contains ten species:
Gayenna americana Nicolet, 1849 – Chile, Argentina
Gayenna brasiliensis Roewer, 1951 – Brazil
Gayenna chrysophila Mello-Leitão, 1926 – Brazil
Gayenna furcata (Keyserling, 1879) – Peru
Gayenna ignava Banks, 1898 – Mexico
Gayenna moreirae (Mello-Leitão, 1915) – Brazil
Gayenna orizaba Banks, 1898 – Mexico
Gayenna sigillum Mello-Leitão, 1941 – Argentina
Gayenna trivittata (Bertkau, 1880) – Brazil
Gayenna vittata (Keyserling, 1881) – Peru

References

Anyphaenidae
Araneomorphae genera